Chaudhary Mateen Ahmed (born 5 November 1958) is an Indian politician from Delhi belonging to the Indian National Congress (INC). He was a Member of the Delhi Legislative Assembly from Seelampur Vidhan Sabha constituency. He was reelected in 2013 as an M.L.A from Seelampur constituency, defeating Kaushal Kumar Mishra (BJP) by 21,728 votes.

Early life
Mateen was born on 5 November 1958 to Chaudhary Mehfooz Ali at Todarpur Village, Ghaziabad District, Uttar Pradesh. In 1976, he completed his graduation (B.A.) from Kishan Degree College, Simbhawali, Meerut University.

Political career

Vidhan Sabha elections
He was elected to the Delhi Legislative Assembly for the first time in 1993 from Seelampur constituency in Delhi under Janata Dal, defeating Jai Kishan DassGupta (BJP) by 1,438 votes. In 1996, he left Janata Dal and joined the Congress party, but during the 1998 Delhi Assembly election, he was denied a ticket by the INC, so he ran as an independent candidate and defeated Data Ram (BJP) by 16,375 votes, thus improving his tally. In 2003 and 2008, he was elected again for the Third and Fourth Legislative Assembly of Delhi on the Congress ticket, defeating Sanjay Kumar Jain (BJP) by 21,712 votes and Sita Ram Gupta (BJP) by 26,277 votes respectively.

2013 elections
In 2013, he was elected again for the Fifth Legislative Assembly of Delhi, defeating Kaushal Kumar Mishra (BJP) by 21,728 votes. Mateen Ahmed was selected as a pro tem speaker of the Delhi assembly, 2013.

Delhi Wakf council
He was elected as a chairman of the Delhi Wakf Board in November 2004, succeeding Haroon Yusuf. In 2009, he was re-elected again for the chairman of the Delhi Wakf Board.

Positions held

Personal life
Chaudhary Mateen has been married to Suraiya Begum; they have three sons. First son Zubair Ahmed is also in Politics, second son owns garment showroom in Delhi & his youngest son is working with Zee Media.

References

Members of the Delhi Legislative Assembly
Living people
Indian National Congress politicians from Delhi
Delhi MLAs 2013–2015
Delhi MLAs 2008–2013
1958 births
Janata Dal politicians